José Agustín de Dios Edwards Ossandón (May 20, 1815 – September 1878) was a Chilean politician and businessman, and one of the main forces behind the early railroad construction in South America.

Agustín Edwards was born in La Serena, the son of George Edwards Brown and Isabel Ossandón Iribarren. At the age of 19, he started to manage the silver smelting operations owned by his father in the cities of Vallenar and Freirina. In 1837, by the age of 22, he became independent and moved to the city of Copiapó, with a small capital he had managed to save.

In 1849 he founded the Bank of Valparaíso. He married Juana Ross Edwards on April 6, 1851, with whom he had eight children.  He was an active promoter of the railroads in South America. He worked in the construction of the Copiapó-Caldera railway, the first Chilean railroad (and one of the first in Latin America) that was inaugurated on December 25, 1851. He then concentrated on the nitrate exploitation. He became president of the Nitrate Company, and began the studies for a railroad between Antofagasta and Bolivia.

He was elected to the lower house of parliament on 1861, and then again in 1873. In 1876, he was elected a Senator for Valparaiso, a position he held until his death. He died in the city of Limache in 1878.

See also
Edwards family

External links
Official biography

1815 births
1878 deaths
People from La Serena
People from Coquimbo
People from Elqui Province
Chilean people of English descent
A
Members of the Senate of Chile
Members of the Chamber of Deputies of Chile